The 2001–02 Canada men's national ice hockey team represented Canada at the 2002 Winter Olympics officially hosted by Salt Lake City in Utah.

Team Canada, coached by Pat Quinn, won the gold medal. It was the first Olympic gold medal for Canada in men's ice hockey since the Edmonton Mercurys won gold at the 1952 Winter Olympics in Oslo, Norway.

2002 Winter Olympics roster
Head coach: Pat Quinn
Ed Belfour – Dallas Stars
Rob Blake – Colorado Avalanche
Eric Brewer – Edmonton Oilers
Martin Brodeur – New Jersey Devils
Theoren Fleury – New York Rangers
Adam Foote – Colorado Avalanche
Simon Gagne – Philadelphia Flyers
Jarome Iginla – Calgary Flames
Curtis Joseph – Toronto Maple Leafs
Ed Jovanovski – Vancouver Canucks
Paul Kariya – Mighty Ducks of Anaheim
Mario Lemieux (C) – Pittsburgh Penguins
Eric Lindros – New York Rangers
Al MacInnis – St. Louis Blues
Scott Niedermayer – New Jersey Devils
Joe Nieuwendyk – Dallas Stars
Owen Nolan – San Jose Sharks
Michael Peca – New York Islanders
Chris Pronger – (A) St. Louis Blues
Joe Sakic – (A) Colorado Avalanche
Brendan Shanahan – Detroit Red Wings
Ryan Smyth – Edmonton Oilers
Steve Yzerman (A) – Detroit Red Wings

See also
 Canada men's national ice hockey team
 Ice hockey at the 2002 Winter Olympics
 Ice hockey at the Olympic Games
 List of Canadian national ice hockey team rosters

References

 
Canada men's national ice hockey team seasons